The Night Hawk is a 1938 American crime film directed by Sidney Salkow and written by Earl Felton. The film stars Robert Livingston, June Travis, Robert Armstrong, Ben Welden, Lucien Littlefield and Joe Downing. The film was released on October 1, 1938, by Republic Pictures.

Plot

Cast 
Robert Livingston as Slim Torrence
June Travis as Della Parrish
Robert Armstrong as Charlie McCormick
Ben Welden as Otto Miller
Lucien Littlefield as Parrish
Joe Downing as Lefty
Roland Got as Willie Sing
Cy Kendall as Capt. Teague
Paul Fix as Spider
Bill Burrud as Bobby McCormick 
Charles C. Wilson as Lonigan
Dwight Frye as John Colley
Paul McVey as Larsen
Robert Homans as Mulruney

References

External links
 

1938 films
1930s English-language films
American crime films
1938 crime films
Republic Pictures films
Films directed by Sidney Salkow
American black-and-white films
1930s American films